Frassati is a surname. Notable people with the surname include:

Pier Giorgio Frassati (1901–1925), Italian Catholic activist
Luciana Frassati Gawronska (1902–2007), Italian author
 

Italian-language surnames